Maria Luise Thurmair née Mumelter (27 September 1912 – 24 October 2005) was a German Catholic theologian, hymnodist and writer. She contributed the lyrics of many hymns when the Catholic hymnal Gotteslob was first published in 1975.

Career 
Maria Luise Mumelter was born in Bozen, South Tyrol, then in the Austro-Hungarian Empire, the daughter of the towns's last Austrian . Due to political pressure, the family moved to Innsbruck, where she earned her Matura. She studied philosophy at the University of Innsbruck and attended classes in Liturgics with Josef Andreas Jungmann SJ. She wrote her doctoral thesis on Irene Angelina of Byzanz in 1936. She married Georg Thurmair, a poet in Munich, in 1941.

She began during World War II to work for the Innsbruck hymnal Gotteslob, followed by contributions to several hymnals of German dioceses, the songbooks Singende Gemeinde (Singing congregation) and Kirchenlied (Church song), a precursor of the later Gotteslob. She translated Latin hymns and several books. She published during the war Liebesgespräche im Krieg (Love talks during the war), a lyrical dialogue of letters including poems which she exchanged with her husband who was a soldier. It was reprinted in 1981 by Aventinus. She lectured on subjects such as faith, liturgical year, first communion and religious education. The couple had six children and lived in Munich.

From 1963, Thurmair worked on the first Catholic hymnal for German-speaking countries, Gotteslob (GL), as the only woman in the commission. The first edition of 1975 included 38 of her songs, which was the highest number for one hymnwriter. Some of her hymns (or single stanzas) have also been included in the Protestant hymnal Evangelisches Gesangbuch (EG). The current Gotteslob includes 28 of her songs.

She received the Papal order Pro Ecclesia et Pontifice. She died in Germering, near Munich.

Works

Selected prose works 
 
 Fünf Paar Kinderschuhe

Hymns in Gotteslob 
Several of her hymns appear in the current Catholic German hymnal Gotteslob, and even more in its first 1975 edition. She wrote several lyrics for the parts of the mass Kyrie, Gloria, Credo, and many psalm songs, often on traditional melodies. Several songs are related to the occasions of the liturgical year, such as Advent, Christmas and Pentecost. Other songs relate to events such as the Stations of the Cross. She wrote many Psalmlieder, rephrasing psalms. The table lists the incipit, the place of the hymn in the liturgy, a model for the text, year and author of the melody in the current Gotteslob when the song appears in it, otherwise of the first edition, the year when the text was completed, the numbers in the first and current Gotteslob, and notes.

Literature 
 Martin Lätzel, "Thurmair-Mumelter, Maria-Luise." In Biographisch-Bibliographisches Kirchenlexikon (BBKL), vol 27, Bautz, Nordhausen 2007, .

References

External links 
 
 Profil von: Thurmair-Mumelter, Maria Luise University of Leipzig
 Dank sei dir, Vater, für das ewge Leben gesangbuch-online.de

German Roman Catholic hymnwriters
20th-century German writers
Writers from Bolzano
20th-century Roman Catholic theologians
Women Christian theologians
1912 births
2005 deaths
University of Innsbruck alumni
Women hymnwriters
20th-century German women writers